Guangxilemur is a genus of adapiform primate that lived in Asia during the late Eocene.

References

Literature cited

 

Prehistoric strepsirrhines
Eocene mammals of Asia
Fossil taxa described in 1998
Eocene primates
Prehistoric primate genera